Kirby Sigston Manor is a manor house in the village of Kirby Sigston in North Yorkshire, England.

It has been listed Grade II on the National Heritage List for England since January 1953. The house primarily dates from 1826. It was expanded in the 20th century. It is two storeys in height with a three-bay plan. It has a pair of four-bay plans to the rear of the house. The main door to the house has a Doric doorcase. It has extensive gardens including a lake with a boathouse and a weir.

The house is owned by Rishi Sunak, leader of the Conservative Party and Prime Minister of the United Kingdom, who bought it for £1.5 million before he became an MP. He was elected as the MP for the local constituency of Richmond (Yorks) in 2015. In 2021 Sunak was granted planning permission to build a leisure complex with a gym, swimming pool and outdoor tennis court in a paddock at the house, which required an upgraded electricity supply. This work was expected to cost £400,000.

Activists from the environmental charity Greenpeace projected a film onto the facade of the house in November 2022 as a protest regarding Sunak's government's policies on fuel poverty in the United Kingdom.

References

Country houses in North Yorkshire
Grade II listed buildings in North Yorkshire
Grade II listed houses
Hambleton District
Houses completed in 1826
Manor houses in England
Rishi Sunak